Cedar Crest, California may refer to:
Cedar Crest, Fresno County, California
Cedar Crest, Nevada County, California